is a passenger railway station in the city of Tōon, Ehime Prefecture, Japan. It is on the Yokogawara Line, operated by Iyotetsu. The station's mascot is a statue of Mazinger Z.

Lines
During most of the day, trains arrive every fifteen minutes. Trains continue from Matsuyama City Station on the Takahama Line to Takahama Station.

Layout
The station consists of a single island platform connected to the station building by a level crossing. The station is staffed.

History
The station was opened on September 4, 1938. It was relocated 100 meters towards Matsuyamashi Station on July 20, 1981 with the opening of Aidaigakubu Minamiguchi Station.

Surrounding area
 Toon City Hall
 Ehime Prefectural Toon High School
 Toon Municipal Shigenobu Junior High School
 Ehime Prefectural Shigenobu Special Needs School
 Ehime Prefectural Minara Special Needs School

See also
 List of railway stations in Japan

References

External links

Iyotetsu official station information

Iyotetsu Yokogawara Line
Railway stations in Ehime Prefecture
Railway stations in Japan opened in 1938
Tōon, Ehime